SQ3 may refer to:

SQ3, a galactic quadrant in the Milky Way
SQ3, mixtape by Lil Wayne
Space Quest III, a video game
Microsoft SQ3, a system on a chip